Tyrant of the Sea is a 1950 American historical war film set during the Napoleonic Wars and starring Ron Randell, Rhys Williams and Lester Matthews. It was directed by Lew Landers.

Production
The film began as a project titled The Return of Captain Bligh and was to star Charles Laughton, who had famously played Captain Bligh in Mutiny on the Bounty (1935). However Laughton, did not wish to repeat his performance, so the script was rewritten to focus on a fictitious character based on Bligh that would eventually be played by Rhys Williams.

Filming began on August 16, 1950.

The film's sets were designed by art director Paul Palmentola.

Cast
 Rhys Williams as Captain Blake
 Ron Randell as Lt. Hawkins
 Lester Matthews as Lord Nelson
 Valentine Perkins as Betsy Blake
 Doris Lloyd as Elizabeth Blake
 Ross Elliott as Palmer
 Harry Cording as Sampson Edwards
 Terry Kilburn as Dick Savage – Sailor 
 Maurice Marsac as Phillipe Daumer 
 William Fawcett as Shawn O'Donnell 
 Don C. Harvey as Moriarty 
 James Fairfax as Oliver Sibley
 Stanley Andrews as Officer
 Frank Ferguson as Officer 
 Percy Helton as Crewman
Randell made the film while also appearing on stage in a double bill of Terence Rattigan plays, Harlequinade and The Browning Version.

References

External links

Tyrant of the Sea at Variety

1950 films
American war films
Columbia Pictures films
Napoleonic Wars naval films
Cultural depictions of Horatio Nelson
American historical films
1950s war films
1950s historical films
Films directed by Lew Landers
Films set in the 1800s
Films set in England
American black-and-white films
1950s English-language films
1950s American films